When the Sun Goes Down may refer to:

Albums
 When the Sun Goes Down (Kenny Chesney album), or the title song (see below), 2004
 When the Sun Goes Down (Selena Gomez & the Scene album), or the title song, 2011
 When the Sun Goes Down, by Ernestine Anderson, 1985
 When the Sun Goes Down, or the title song, by Red 7, 1987
 When the Sun Goes Down 1934–1941, by Leroy Carr, 2011

Songs
 "When the Sun Goes Down" (Arctic Monkeys song), 2006
 "When the Sun Goes Down" (Kenny Chesney song), 2004
 "When the Sun Goes Down", by DJ Fresh and Adam F from Jungle Sound: The Bassline Strikes Back!
 "When the Sun Goes Down", by Screwball from Loyalty
 "When the Sun Goes Down", from the musical In the Heights

See also 
 Sun Goes Down (disambiguation)
 When That Evening Sun Goes Down (disambiguation)